Hollywood in Uniform is a 1943 American short documentary film directed by Ralph Staub as part of the Screen Snapshots series. It was nominated for an Academy Award at the 16th Academy Awards for Best Short Subject (One-Reel).

Cast

 Eddie Albert as Himself
 Desi Arnaz as Himself
 Gene Autry as Himself
 Art Baker as Narrator
 John Carroll as Himself
 Jackie Cooper as Himself
 Glenn Ford as Himself
 Clark Gable as Himself
 Van Heflin as Himself
 John Howard as Himself
 Alan Ladd as Himself
 Bela Lugosi as Himself
 George Montgomery as Himself
 Wayne Morris as Himself
 John Payne as Himself
 Tyrone Power as Himself
 Gene Raymond as Himself
 Ronald Reagan as Himself
 Charles "Buddy" Rogers as Himself
 Robert Stack as Himself
 James Stewart as Himself (archive footage)
 Rudy Vallée as Himself

References

External links
 

1943 films
1943 short films
1943 documentary films
1940s short documentary films
American short documentary films
American World War II propaganda shorts
Black-and-white documentary films
American black-and-white films
Documentary films about Hollywood, Los Angeles
Columbia Pictures short films
1940s English-language films
1940s American films